A Little Hero is a 1913 American short comedy film featuring Mabel Normand.

Cast
 Mabel Normand

References

External links

1913 films
1913 comedy films
1913 short films
Silent American comedy films
American silent short films
American black-and-white films
Films directed by George Nichols
Keystone Studios films
Articles containing video clips
Films produced by Mack Sennett
American comedy short films
Mutual Film films
1910s American films